Christ Church is in Meadows Avenue, Thornton, Lancashire, England.  It is an active Anglican parish church in the deanery of Poulton, the archdeaconry of Lancaster, and the diocese of Blackburn.

History

Christ Church has been the parish church of Thornton-Cleveleys since 1836.  The church was built originally in 1835–37 to a design by Joseph Parkinson.  The chancel was added in 1913–14 by the Lancaster architects Austin, Paley and Austin., The (now non-functional) Pipe Organ is by Rushworth & Dreaper of Liverpool and was installed in 1950, In 1963 Leach, Rhodes and Walker rebuilt the nave, added the tower and built parish rooms.

Architecture

The authors of the Buildings of England series comment that the church and parish rooms have "a mishmash of an exterior".  The church is constructed in yellow sandstone with red sandstone dressings.  The architectural style is Free Perpendicular.  Standing to the southwest of the church are single-storey parish rooms, from which rises a tower with an open bell stage and a saddleback roof.  Inside the church is stained glass installed in 1974 and designed by the artist Brian Clarke.

See also

List of ecclesiastical works by Austin and Paley (1895–1914)

References

External links
Photographs from Lancashire OnLine Parish Clerks

Church of England church buildings in Lancashire
Gothic Revival church buildings in England
Gothic Revival architecture in Lancashire
Diocese of Blackburn
Paley and Austin buildings
Christ Church, Thornton